Can do is a motto of the U.S. Navy Naval Construction Battalions, popularly known as the Seabees.  Since March 5 1942, the Seabees have provided numerous construction work and services, in Navy facilities and operations around the world.  

Their official motto is "We build, we fight." However the motto "can do" has also been adopted as a motto. It has appeared in numerous works pertaining to the Seabees, including official documents, official naval histories, official government websites for the Navy, and websites for related cultural institutions.  

The motto received significant depiction in the 1944 film The Fighting Seabees, which starred John Wayne.

See also
 Military engineers
 Seabees in World War II

References

External links

 The Seabee Museum and Memorial Park

 United States Navy organization
Seabees
Military mottos